The general speed limits in Greece are as follows:

References

Greece
Roads in Greece